Raiche or variation may refer to:

People
 Alcide Raîche, mid-20th-century mayor of Shawinigan-Sud, Quebec, Canada
 Bessie Raiche née Medlar (1875–1932), U.S. businesswoman and dentist-physician
 Catherine Raiche (born 1989), gridiron football office personnel. VP of NFL Philly Eagles
 Julie Raîche, early-21st-century president of Institut québécois de planification financière (IQPF)
 Lucie Raiche, discus silver medalist for Canada at the 1976 Summer Paralympics
 Rose-de-Lima Raiche (19th century), mother of Victoria's Cross recipient Jean Brillant

Other uses
 Raiche, a planemaker
 Raîche v. Canada (Attorney General), a court case about the district boundary between Miramichi—Grand Lake and Acadie—Bathurst
 Raiche's manzanita (Raiche), a subspecies and cultivar of Arctostaphylos stanfordiana

See also

 Raiché Coutev Sisters, a female vocal choir, not sisters
 
 Rasche (surname)
 Rasch (surname)
 Raich (disambiguation)